The innermost intercostal muscle is a layer of intercostal muscles. It may also be called the intima of the internal intercostal muscles. It is the deepest muscular layer of the thorax, with muscle fibres running vertically (in parallel with the internal intercostal muscles). It is present only in the middle of each intercostal space, and often not present higher up the rib cage. It lies deep to the plane that contains the intercostal nerves and intercostal vessels, and the internal intercostal muscles. The diaphragm is continuous with the innermost intercostal muscle.

Additional images

References

External links

  - "Thoracic Wall: The Intercostal Nerve and Vessels"
  - "Transverse section of thorax."
 

Muscles of the torso